Gabriel Osvaldo Ruiz (born January 23, 1980 in Arrecifes) is a retired Argentine football defender.

Ruiz started his playing career with Newell's Old Boys in 1999. In 2005, he joined Tiro Federal and helped the club to secure promotion to the Argentine Primera.

After Tiro Federal were relegated in 2006, Ruiz had brief stints with Libertad in Paraguay and 2nd division Unión de Santa Fe before joining Gimnasia de Jujuy in 2007.

At the beginning of May 2009 Ruiz signed for the Finnish Veikkausliiga team FC Haka. He failed to make debut for FC Haka and returned to Gimnasia de Jujuy.

References

External links

1980 births
Living people
Argentine footballers
Argentine expatriate footballers
People from Arrecifes
Sportspeople from Buenos Aires Province
Association football defenders
Newell's Old Boys footballers
Tiro Federal footballers
Club Libertad footballers
Unión de Santa Fe footballers
Gimnasia y Esgrima de Jujuy footballers
Guillermo Brown footballers
FC Haka players
Talleres de Córdoba footballers
Deportivo Maipú players
Argentino de Mendoza players
Unión de Sunchales footballers
Argentine Primera División players
Argentine expatriate sportspeople in Paraguay
Argentine expatriate sportspeople in Finland
Expatriate footballers in Paraguay
Expatriate footballers in Finland

es:Gabriel Ruiz Galindo